Malawi competed in the 2010 Commonwealth Games held in Delhi, India, from 3 to 14 October 2010.

Netball

Malawi Women's Netball squad comprised:
 Joanna Kachilika
 Peace Kaluwa
 Mwayi Kumwenda
 Linda Magombo
 Slyvia Malenga
 Beatrice Mpinganjira
 Caroline Mtukule
 Grace Mwafulirwa
 Ester Nkhoma
 Sindi Simtowe
 Towera Vinkhumbo
 Mary Waya

Preliminary round

Pool A

 Goal percentage (G%) = 100 × GF/GA. Accurate to one decimal place.
 Highlighted teams advanced to the medal playoffs; other teams contested classification matches.

See also
 2010 Commonwealth Games

Nations at the 2010 Commonwealth Games 
Malawi at the Commonwealth Games
Com